Elections for Lewisham London Borough Council were held on 3 May 2018, the same day as for other London Boroughs. All 54 seats were up for election. The Labour Party won all 54 seats in a landslide victory, winning 60% of the popular vote. The Green Party lost their sole council seat, leaving the party without representation on Lewisham Borough Council for the first time in 16 years.

Overall results 

|}

Results by ward 
Asterisk denotes the sitting councillor.

Bellingham

Blackheath

Brockley 
John Coughlin was the sole Opposition councillor (2014-2018) and subsequently lost his seat.

Catford South 
In June 2019, Smith left the Labour Party in opposition to Jeremy Corbyn, the then Leader of the party. He now sits as an Independent.

Crofton Park

Downham

Evelyn

Forest Hill

Grove Park

Ladywell

Lee Green

Lewisham Central

New Cross

Perry Vale

Rushey Green

Sydenham

Telegraph Hill

Whitefoot

2018-2022 by-elections

The by-election was called following the resignation of Councillor Alex Feis-Bryce.

The by-election was called following the resignation of Councillor Janet Daby.

References

2018 London Borough council elections
2018